Walthourville Presbyterian Church is a historic Presbyterian church on Allenhurst Antioch Road near Walthourville, Georgia, United States. Construction was started in 1884 and is a frame structure in a Gothic Revival style. It replaced a building that was destroyed by a storm in 1881, which itself replaced a building destroyed by fire in 1877. Except for the main entrance, all windows and doors are lancet arched.  The interior retains all of its original furniture.

It was added to the National Register of Historic Places in 1987.

References

Presbyterian churches in Georgia (U.S. state)
Churches on the National Register of Historic Places in Georgia (U.S. state)
Gothic Revival church buildings in Georgia (U.S. state)
Churches completed in 1884
Buildings and structures in Long County, Georgia
National Register of Historic Places in Long County, Georgia